The Ocoña River is a river located in the Arequipa region in southern Peru. It helped form Peru's deep canyon walls.

See also
List of rivers of Peru
List of rivers of the Americas by coastline

References

Rivers of Peru
Rivers of Arequipa Region